Jorge Acuña (born 23 August 1948) is an Uruguayan boxer. 

He competed in the 1972 Summer Olympics in Munich. In the opening round, he lost to Leo Rwabwogo of Uganda.

1972 Olympic record
Below are the results of Jorge Acuña, a Uruguayan flyweight boxer who competed at the 1972 Munich Olympics:

 Round of 64: lost to Leo Rwabwogo (Uganda) by decision, 0-5.

References

1948 births
Living people
Boxers at the 1972 Summer Olympics
Uruguayan male boxers
Olympic boxers of Uruguay
Flyweight boxers